Rudolph William Debnar (May 9, 1916 – May 29, 1982) was an American basketball player. He played college basketball for Duquesne. In 1941, he was named All-Pennsylvania second team. He later played professionally in the National Basketball League for the Akron Goodyear Wingfoots and Youngstown Bears; he averaged 5.5 points per game for his career.

References

1916 births
1982 deaths
Akron Goodyear Wingfoots players
American men's basketball players
Basketball players from Pennsylvania
Duquesne Dukes men's basketball players
Guards (basketball)
People from Charleroi, Pennsylvania
Player-coaches
Youngstown Bears players